"Say What You Want" is a song by Scottish rock band Texas, written by band members Johnny McElhone and Sharleen Spiteri. It was the first single to be released from the group's fourth studio album, White on Blonde (1997). Released in January 1997, it is the band's biggest hit commercially, peaking at number three on the UK Singles Chart. As of March 2023, the single is certified platinum in the United Kingdom for sales and streams exceeding 600,000 units. The accompanying music video released to promote the single shows lead singer Sharleen Spiteri in a futuristic room.

In 1998, Texas collaborated with Wu-Tang Clan members Method Man and RZA to remix the song as "Say What You Want (All Day, Every Day)". This version features Method Man and RZA on vocals and was released as a single in March 1998, peaking at number four on the UK Singles Chart and reaching the top 10 in Iceland, the Netherlands, and New Zealand. Both version of the song are included on Texas's 2000 compilation album, The Greatest Hits.

Critical reception
Quentin Harrison from Albumism wrote in his retrospective review of the album, that "the bulk of White on Blonde examines the high and lows of modern love as best heard on its lead single 'Say What You Want'." Catherine Eade from Music Week noted "the easy-on-the-ear nature" of the song, "with its Marvin Gaye-influenced chorus". David Sinclair from The Times viewed it as "charming".

Track listings
 UK and Australian CD1 
 "Say What You Want" – 3:53
 "Cold Day Dream" – 4:01
 "Tear It Up" – 3:23
 "Say What You Want" (Boilerhouse remix) – 4:19

 UK and Australian CD2 
 "Say What You Want" – 3:53
 "Say What You Want" (Rae & Christian mix) – 4:50
 "Good Advice" – 4:50
 "Say What You Want" (Rae & Christian instrumental mix) – 4:50

 UK cassette single and European CD single 
 "Say What You Want" – 3:53
 "Cold Day Dream" – 4:01

Personnel
Personnel are lifted from The Greatest Hits album booklet.
 Texas – production, mixing
 Johnny McElhone – writing, guitars, keyboards, programming
 Sharleen Spiteri – writing, programming
 Ally McErlaine – guitars
 Eddie Campbell – keyboards, programming
 Richard Hynd – programming
 The Boilerhouse Boys – additional production
 Paul Taylor – additional programming

Charts

Weekly charts

Year-end charts

Certifications and sales

"Say What You Want (All Day, Every Day)"

The song was remixed as "Say What You Want (All Day, Every Day)", featuring Method Man and RZA from the Wu-Tang Clan, and re-released as a double A-side with "Insane" on 9 March 1998. This version was also a success, peaking at number four on the UK Singles Chart and reaching number three in New Zealand, becoming the band's highest-charting hit in the latter country. A second music video was created, showing Spiteri in a park.

Regarding this version, Spiteri said in Q magazine, "They're the biggest guys I've ever seen in my life. They're like basketball players. I'd just recorded a vocal, and Chef Raekwon's like, 'Yo! Who's that singing?' And RZA goes, 'It's Girlie' – 'cos they called me Girlie. And Raekwon goes, 'Man, you black!' And I laughed so loud. Method Man's a pussycat."

Track listings
 UK CD1 
 "Insane" – 4:45
 "Say What You Want (All Day, Every Day)" – 4:06
 "Polo Mint City" (full version) – 2:50
 "Say What You Want (All Day, Every Day)" (Trailermen mix) – 8:38

 UK CD2 
 "Say What You Want (All Day, Every Day)" (extended version) – 5:02
 "Insane" (The Second Scroll) – 6:33
 "Say What You Want (All Day, Every Day)" (RZA instrumental) – 5:13
 "Insane" (The Second Scroll dub) – 6:35

 UK cassette single 
 "Say What You Want (All Day, Every Day)" – 4:06
 "Insane" – 4:45

 European CD single 
 "Say What You Want (All Day, Every Day)" – 4:06
 "Insane" (The Second Scroll) – 6:33

Personnel
Personnel are lifted from The Greatest Hits album booklet.
 Johnny McElhone – writing, keyboards, programming, remix and additional production (as Johnny Mac)
 Sharleen Spiteri – writing, keyboards
 Method Man – writing (as Clifford Smith)
 RZA – writing (as Robert Diggs), keyboards, production, programming
 Ally McErlaine – guitars
 Eddie Campbell – keyboards, programming

Charts

Weekly charts

Year-end charts

Release history

References

1997 singles
1998 singles
Number-one singles in Scotland
Song recordings produced by RZA
Songs written by Johnny McElhone
Songs written by Method Man
Songs written by RZA
Songs written by Sharleen Spiteri
Texas (band) songs
Wu-Tang Clan songs